Triantafyllos Tsongas (born 23 October 1938) is a Greek rower. He competed in the men's coxed four event at the 1960 Summer Olympics.

References

External links
 

1938 births
Living people
Greek male rowers
Olympic rowers of Greece
Rowers at the 1960 Summer Olympics
Sportspeople from Kozani